Garrie is a British surname. Notable people with the surname include:

 John Garrie (1923–1998), British actor
 Nick Garrie (born 1949), British singer-songwriter

Surnames of British Isles origin
Scottish surnames